Aralia nudicaulis (commonly wild sarsaparilla, false sarsaparilla, shot bush, small spikenard, wild liquorice, and rabbit root) is a flowering plant of northern and eastern North America which reaches a height of  with creeping underground stems.

Description
In the spring the underground stems produce compound leaves that are large and finely toothed. These bloom from May to July and develop into purple-black edible berries. The leaves go dormant in summer before the fruits ripen. The berries taste a little spicy and sweet.

The stem of the plant grows straight up from the ground and divides into a whorl of 3 stems which branch up and out, each forming 3 to 7 (most often 5) pinnately compound leaflets; leaflets ovate, acute, serrate, green.
Technically, all the leaflets on one plant are considered to be one entire leaf, and the stems that connect the leaflets are called rachis; this arrangement is called doubly compound.  In some cases some of the leaflets are further completely subdivided, forming a triply compound pattern.

This species is similar to Aralia hispida (Bristly Sarsaparilla), which is a little larger with stems covered with bristly hairs, hence the name. The stems of A. nudicaulis are smooth.

Habitat
This plant is so common in certain ecologies that it is an indicator species for these Eastern Forests of North America: Northern Hardwood Forest, Beech-Maple Forest, and Oak-Hickory Forest.  Also common in the Interior Cedar Hemlock forest ecosystem in central and southern British Columbia.

Because it sometimes grows with groups of 3 leaflets, it can be mistaken for poison ivy; the way to tell the difference is that Wild Sarsaparilla lacks a woody base and has fine teeth along the edges of the leaves.

The roots have been used as substitutes for true Sarsaparilla (Smilax sp.) in herbal medicine.

References

External links
Connecticut Botanical Society: Aralia nudicaulis 
Rook.org:Aralia nudicaulis
Flowering Plants in the Northern Deciduous Forest  - pictures of leaves, flowers, and fruit for identification

nudicaulis
Flora of Ontario
Hardwood forest plants
Plants described in 1753
Taxa named by Carl Linnaeus
Flora without expected TNC conservation status